The 2012–13 National League 1 was the fourth season of the third tier of the English domestic rugby union competitions since the professionalised format of the second division was introduced.  New teams to the division included Esher who were relegated from the 2011–12 RFU Championship, Loughborough Students who were promoted as champions from the 2011–12 National League 2 North along with Old Albanian (champions) and Richmond (playoffs) who came up from the 2011–12 National League 2 South.

Ealing Trailfinders finished in first place and, as champions, were promoted to the 2013–14 RFU Championship for next season. Macclesfield, Sedgley Park and Cambridge were relegated to the fourth tier, the first two named, to the 2013–14 National League 2 North and Cambridge to the 2013–14 National League 2 South.

Participating teams and locations

League table

Results

Round 1

Round 2

Round 3

Round 4

Round 5

Round 6

Round 7

Round 8

Round 9

Round 10

Round 11

Round 12

Round 13

Round 14

Round 15

Round 16 

Postponed.  Game rescheduled for 9 February 2013.

Postponed.  Game rescheduled for 9 February 2013.

Game brought forward from 9 February 2013.

Round 17

Round 18

Round 19 

Postponed.  Game rescheduled to 9 February 2013.

Postponed.  Game rescheduled to 23 February 2013.

Postponed.  Game rescheduled to 9 February 2013.

Postponed.  Game rescheduled to 9 February 2013.

Postponed.  Game rescheduled to 9 February 2013.

Postponed.  Game rescheduled to 9 February 2013.

Postponed.  Game rescheduled to 23 February 2013.

Postponed.  Game rescheduled to 23 February 2013.

Round 20 

Postponed.  Game rescheduled to 16 March 2013.

Postponed.  Game rescheduled to 16 March 2013.

Postponed.  Game rescheduled to 16 March 2013.

Postponed.  Game rescheduled to 16 March 2013.

Postponed.  Game rescheduled to 16 March 2013.

Postponed.  Game rescheduled to 16 March 2013.

Round 21

Round 16 & 19 (Rescheduled games) 

Game originally set for 22 December 2012.

Game originally set for 22 December 2012.

Game brought forward to 22 December 2012.

Round 22

Round 19 (Rescheduled games)

Round 23

Round 24

Round 20 (Rescheduled games)

Round 25 

Postponed.  Game rescheduled for 4 May 2013.

Postponed.  Game rescheduled for 4 May 2013.

Postponed.  Game rescheduled for 17 April 2013.

Postponed.  Game rescheduled for 4 May 2013.

Postponed.  Game rescheduled for 4 May 2013.

Round 26 

Postponed.  Rescheduled to 11 March 2013.

Round 27

Round 28

Round 25 (Rescheduled game)

Round 29

Round 30

Round 25 (Rescheduled games) 

Game cancelled.

Round 26 (Rescheduled game) 

Game cancelled.

Total Season Attendances

Individual statistics 

 Note if players are tied on tries or points the player with the lowest number of appearances will come first.  Also note that points scorers includes tries as well as conversions, penalties and drop goals.

Top points scorers

Top try scorers

Season records

Team
Largest home win — 99 pts
104 - 5 Rosslyn Park at home to Cambridge on 12 January 2013
Largest away win — 93 pts
105 - 12 Loughborough Students away to Sedgley Park on 4 May 2013
Most points scored — 105 pts
105 - 12 Loughborough Students away to Sedgley Park on 4 May 2013
Most tries in a match — 16 (x2)
Rosslyn Park at home to Cambridge on 12 January 2013
Loughborough Students away to Sedgley Park on 4 May 2013
Most conversions in a match — 13
Loughborough Students away to Sedgley Park on 4 May 2013
Most penalties in a match — 6
Ealing Trailfinders away to Blackheath on 13 October 2012
Most drop goals in a match — 1
N/A - multiple teams

Player
Most points in a match — 36
 Stuart Hall for Loughborough Students away to Sedgley Park on 4 May 2013
Most tries in a match — 7
 Hugo Ellis for Rosslyn Park at home to Cambridge on 12 January 2013
Most conversions in a match — 13
 Stuart Hall for Loughborough Students away to Sedgley Park on 4 May 2013
Most penalties in a match —  6
 Tom Wheatcroft for Ealing Trailfinders away to Blackheath on 13 October 2012
Most drop goals in a match —  1
N/A - multiple players

Attendances
Highest — 1,437 
Richmond at home to Rosslyn Park on 27 October 2012
Lowest — 106 
Sedgley Park at home to Loughborough Students on 4 May 2013
Highest Average Attendance — 857
Coventry
Lowest Average Attendance — 264				
Sedgley Park

References

External links
 NCA Rugby

National
National League 1 seasons